Francisco Salvador Pereira Silva, known as Chico Silva (born 16 March 1967) is a former Portuguese football player.

He played 8 seasons and 143 games in the Primeira Liga with Braga.

Club career
He made his professional debut in the Primeira Liga for Braga on 23 October 1988 as a starter in a 0–0 draw against Marítimo.

References

1967 births
Living people
People from Viana do Castelo
Portuguese footballers
Association football defenders
SC Vianense players
S.C. Braga players
Primeira Liga players
Gil Vicente F.C. players
Liga Portugal 2 players
S.C. Espinho players
F.C. Vizela players
Sportspeople from Viana do Castelo District